State Route 306 (SR 306) is a  state highway in Lander and Eureka counties in northern Nevada, United States. It connects the mining area of Gold Acres in Lander County to Interstate 80 (I-80) at the Beowawe Interchange near Beowawe in Eureka County via Crescent Valley. The road has been a state highway since the 1920s, having been established as part of a much longer State Route 21 by 1929.

Route description

SR 306 begins at the road to Barrack Cortez Mine, just east of Gold Acres in central Lander County. From this point, the route heads in a north-northeasterly direction, away from the mountains of the Shoshone Range. Passing through the town, SR 306 continues on its straight course northward through the valley of the same name. The route reaches the town of Beowawe, where it crosses over the Union Pacific Railroad, and soon after, bridges the Humboldt River. The highway passes briefly through Whirlwind Valley before reaching Interstate 80, where SR 306 terminates at the Beowawe Interchange (exit 261).

History

The road dates back to at least 1929. At that time, it was part of a longer State Route 21 which extended north from SR 2/U.S. Route 50 (US 50) near Austin all the way through Crescent Valley and Beowawe to SR 1/US 40 (now I-80). By 1933, the southern end of SR 21 had been extended beyond Austin, branching from US 50 just west of town and heading in a southwesterly direction towards Ione. The entire route remained a dirt or gravel-graded route until about 1958, when the northern  between Gold Point and US 40 were paved.

Aside from a little more paving south of Gold Point, SR 21 remained unchanged into the 1970s. However, on July 1, 1976, Nevada began a renumbering of its state highways. In this process, the paved portion of the highway between Crescent Valley and US 40/I-80 north of Beowawe was redesignated as State Route 306. This change was first seen on state maps in 1978. The rest of SR 21 remained on official Nevada maps for a short time, but was ultimately removed from the state highway system by 1982. The paved highway extending to the Gold Acres site wasn't shown on state maps until 1993. The route has remained relatively unchanged since.

Major intersections
Note: Mileposts in Nevada reset at county lines; the start and end mileposts are given in the county column.

See also

 List of state highways in Nevada

References

External links

306
Transportation in Eureka County, Nevada
Transportation in Lander County, Nevada